Smart, SMART or S.M.A.R.T. may refer to:

Arts and entertainment 
 Smart (Hey! Say! JUMP album), 2014
 Smart (Hotels.com), former mascot of Hotels.com
 Smart (Sleeper album), 1995 debut album by Sleeper
 SMart, a children's television series about art on CBBC

Businesses and brands 
 S-Mart, a Mexican grocery store chain
 Smart (advertising agency), an Australian company
 SmartCell, a network operator in Nepal
 Smart Communications, a cellular service provider in the Philippines
 Smart Technologies, a company providing group collaboration tools
 Smart Telecom, a network operator in the Republic of Ireland
 Smart (cigarette), an Austrian brand
 Smart (drink), a brand of fruit-flavored soda produced by The Coca-Cola Company for Mainland China

Computing 
 Smart device, an electronic device connected to other devices or networks wirelessly
 Self-Monitoring, Analysis, and Reporting Technology (S.M.A.R.T.), a standard used in computer storage devices
 SMART Information Retrieval System, an information retrieval system developed at Cornell University in the 1960s
 Smart Package Manager, a planned successor to the APT-RPM package management utility

Grants 
 Small firms' Merit Award for Research and Technology, run by the UK Department of Trade and Industry in the 1980s and 1990s
 Smart Scotland
 National Science & Mathematics Access to Retain Talent Grant, a former US federal grant
 SMART Defense Scholarship Program, a US Department of Defense workforce development program

Transport 
 Smart (marque), a car manufacturer co-owned by Mercedes-Benz and Geely
 SMART Tunnel, the Stormwater Management and Road Tunnel in Kuala Lumpur, Malaysia
 Scandinavian Multi Access Reservations for Travel Agents, a computerized system for ticket reservation

United States 
 Sonoma–Marin Area Rail Transit, in the northern San Francisco Bay Area, California
 South Metro Area Regional Transit in Wilsonville, Oregon
 Starkville MSU Area Rapid Transit, a public transportation system in Starkville, Mississippi, and Mississippi State University
 Suburban Mobility Authority for Regional Transportation, the transit authority for suburban Detroit, Michigan

Other uses 
 Smart (surname), a surname (including a list of people with the name)
 Smart Museum of Art, a museum in Chicago
 Simple Modular Architecture Research Tool, a biological database used in the identification and analysis of protein domains within protein sequences
 SMART (Malaysia), a disaster relief and rescue task force
 International Association of Sheet Metal, Air, Rail and Transportation Workers (SMART), a North American labor union
 Sikh Mediawatch and Resource Task Force, the former name of the Sikh American Legal Defense and Education Fund
 Start Making A Reader Today, an Oregon-based volunteer literacy program for at-risk PreK-3 readers
 Studies in Medieval and Renaissance Teaching, or SMART, a peer-reviewed journal
 SMArt 155, a German artillery shell that uses anti-armour submunitions
  Smart #1, an upcoming electric crossover SUV
 SMART criteria (specific, measurable, assignable, realistic, time-related), a mnemonic used to set goals or objectives and evaluate performance
 SMART Recovery (Self Management and Recovery Training), addiction recovery based on REBT principles
 SMART-1 (Small Missions for Advanced Research in Technology), a series of European Space Agency space missions
 SMART-R, the Shared Mobile Atmospheric Research and Teaching Radar
 Intelligence

See also 
 Smartt (disambiguation)
 Snart (disambiguation)
 Smarts (disambiguation)